Current Account is a British current affairs television programme that was broadcast from 1968 until May 1983. on BBC Television in Scotland.  Among its various presenters were Donald MacCormick, George Reid and Kenneth Roy.  Transmitted weekly on a Thursday at 20:30 it consisted of a one subject filmed or one studio report. Its editor was Matthew Spicer.

During the run-up to the 1979 Scottish devolution referendum it had a sister programme dealing only with politics called Public Account.

References

External links

BBC television news shows
BBC Scotland television shows